The Provost's House is a five-bay, two-storey house with seven-bay single-storey wings on each side, which dates from 1759 and was built for Provost Francis Andrews of Trinity College.

Design
The designer is unknown but may have been the Dublin architect John Smyth. It has a Palladian design with a central Venetian window and doric pilasters and is similar to that built by Lord Burlington for General Wade (now demolished) in London in the 1830s, who in turn copied a drawing by Andrea Palladio. Another version of the house existed in Potsdam.

The ground floor ashlar stonework is heavily tooled with round-headed arches spanning over the windows. The centre arch over the entrance door is slightly wider than the others. The upper floor consists of pilasters standing on a string course and supporting a strong cornice at roof level.  The two wings are both similar with a three-bay breakfront surmounted by a pediment.
It is the only one of Dublin's great Georgian houses which still serves its original purpose.
It lies at the north end of Grafton Street near the corner with Nassau Street and has the unique address of No 1 Grafton Street.

Henry Keene may have designed the interior. Metalwork may have been by Timothy Turner.

It was described by Charles Robert Cockerell in 1823 as follows: "The beautiful front of the Provost's House,...... had been completely spoilt by a high pitched roof and the centre arch having keystone smaller than the sides, producing a disfigured visual effect."

Other usage
In 2017 the house was used as a neutral venue for negotiations between Fianna Fáil and Fine Gael as part of Irish government formation talks.

References

 

Buildings and structures of Trinity College Dublin